Blinken or Blynken may refer to 
Blinken (surname)
 Antony Blinken, the US Secretary of State
Blinkenlights, diagnostic lights used on computers
 "Wynken, Blynken, and Nod", a poem by American writer Eugene Field
 Wynken, Blynken and Nod (film), a 1938 animated short film based on the poem by Field